The Douglas First United Methodist Church was founded in Douglas, Georgia in August 1888.

Early history

The early history of Douglas First United Methodist Church was published in A Centennial History by Elizabeth Lott and others in 1988.

The church today

The congregation is led by Rev. Doug Walker who was appointed at Annual Conference in 2016. The Church is a member of the South Georgia Annual Conference of The United Methodist Church.

See also

External links
Douglas First United Methodist Church

Buildings and structures in Coffee County, Georgia
United Methodist churches in Georgia (U.S. state)
1888 establishments in Georgia (U.S. state)